Season 1 of the Vietnamese competitive reality television series Junior MasterChef Vietnam premiered on VTV3 on October 2, 2016.

Top 12

Elimination Table

  (WINNER) This cook won the competition.
  (RUNNER-UP) This cook finished in second place.
  (WIN) The cook won the individual challenge (Mystery Box or Elimination Test).
  (WIN) The cook was on the winning team in the Team Challenge and directly advanced to the next round.
 (WIN) The cook was on the winning team in the Team Challenge, but still going to the Pressure Test, and advanced.
(WPT) The cook won the Pressure Test.
  (HIGH) The cook was one of the top entries in an individual challenge, but did not win.
 (PT) The cook was on the losing team in the Team Challenge, competed in the Pressure Test, and advanced.
  (IN) The cook was not selected as a top or bottom entry in an individual challenge.
  (IN) The cook was not selected as a top or bottom entry in a Team Challenge.
  (IMM) The cook did not have to compete in that round of the competition and was safe from elimination.
  (IMM) The cook was selected by the Mystery Box Challenge winner and did not have to compete in the Elimination Test.
  (LOW) The cook was one of the bottom entries in an individual challenge, and was the last person to advance.
  (LOW) The cook was one of the bottom entries in a Team Challenge, and their team was last to advance.
  (LOW) The cook was on the losing team in the Team Challenge, and the only person from their team to advance.
 (LOW) The cook was one of the bottom entries but was not the last person to advance.
  (ELIM) The cook was eliminated.

Episode

References

Vietnam
2016 Vietnamese television seasons